Albrecht ("noble", "bright") is a given name or surname of German origin and may refer to:

First name
 Albrecht Agthe, (1790–1873), German music teacher
 Albrecht Altdorfer, (c. 1480–1538) German Renaissance painter
 Albrecht Becker, (1906–2002), German production designer, photographer, and actor
 Albrecht Berblinger, (1770–1829), German constructor (the tailor of ulm)
 Albrecht Brandi, (1914–1966), German U-boat commander in World War II
 Albrecht, Duke of Württemberg, (1865–1939), German field marshal in World War I
 Albrecht von Wallenstein, (1583–1634), Bohemian soldier and politician during the Thirty Years' War
 Albrecht Dieterich, (1866–1908) German classical philologist and religious scholar
 Albrecht Dietz, (1926–2012), German entrepreneur and scientist
 Albrecht Dürer, (1471–1528), German artist and mathematician
 Albrecht Dürer the Elder, German goldsmith and father of Albrecht Dürer
 Albrecht Elof Ihre, (1797–1877), Swedish diplomat and politician
 Albrecht Fölsing, (1940–2018), German physicist and scientific journalist
 Albrecht Fleckenstein, (1917–92), German pharmacologist and physiologist
 Albrecht Haushofer, (1903–1945), German geographer, diplomat and author.
 Albrecht Holder, (born 1958), classical bassoonist
 Albrecht Gessler, German bailiff
 Albrecht Glockendon the Younger, German miniaturist and woodcutter
 Albrecht Gustav von Manstein, (1805–1877), Prussian general
 Albrecht II, Count of Hohenberg-Rotenburg (c. 1235–1298), Count of Hohenberg and Haigerloch 
 Albrecht Kossel, (1853–1927), German biochemist and pioneer in the study of genetics
 Albrecht Krügel, (1913–1945), German Lieutenant Colonel of SS
 Albrecht Mertz von Quirnheim, (1905–1944), German officer and a resistance fighter in Nazi Germany (20 July plot)
 Albrecht Müller, (1939–2018), German sprint canoer and rower
 Albrecht Penck, (1858–1945), German geographer and geologist
 Albrecht Pfister, (c. 1420–c. 1466), German printer
 Albrecht Ritschl, (1822–1889), German Protestant theologian
 Albrecht Ritschl (economist), German Professor of Economic History
 Albrecht Roser, (1922–2011), German master puppeteer
 Albrecht von Roon, (1803–79), Prussian soldier and statesman
 Albrecht III Achilles, (1414–86), Prince-elector of the Margraviate of Brandenburg
 Albrecht of Sweden, (c.1338–1412), medieval Swedish monarch
 Albrecht Schmidt (actor), (1870–1945), Danish film actor
 Albrecht Schöne (born 1925), German Germanist
 Albrecht Schröter, (born 1955), German politician (SPD), mayor of Jena
 Albrecht Unsöld, (1905–95), German astrophysicist
 Albrecht Weber, (1825–1901), German Indologist and historian
 Albrecht of Saxe-Weissenfels, (1659–1692), German prince of the House of Wettin

Surname
 Achim Albrecht, German bodybuilder and professional wrestler
 Albert Albrecht
 Alex Albrecht, American television personality
 Andreas Albrecht (cosmologist), American physicist
 Archduke Albrecht, Duke of Teschen (1817–1895) general who controlled the Austrian Army 
 Art Albrecht (1921–2004), former professional American football player
 Bernard Albrecht, an alias of Bernard Sumner, English singer and guitarist
 Berthold Albrecht (1954–2012), German businessman, (ALDI)
 Carter Albrecht (1973–2007), American musician 
 Conrad Albrecht (1880–1969), German admiral
 Daniel Albrecht, Swiss alpine ski racer
 Ernst Albrecht (politician, born 1930), (1930–2014), German politician (CDU)
 Ernst Albrecht (footballer), (1907–1976), German footballer
 George Alexander Albrecht, German conductor, (1935–2021), long-time music director in Hanover
 Gerd Albrecht, German conductor, born 1935, known for work in contemporary music
 Grant Albrecht, Canadian luger
 Gretchen Albrecht, New Zealand artist (born 1943)
 Harold Albrecht, Canadian politician
 Herman Albrecht, South African soldier
 J. I. Albrecht, American-Canadian sports personality
 Jan Philipp Albrecht, German politician and Member of the European Parliament 
 Katherine Albrecht, American privacy activist
 Karl Albrecht, (1920–2014), German entrepreneur, brother of Theo Albrecht (ALDI)
 Karl Albrecht Jr. (born 1948), German businessman
 Marc Albrecht, German conductor, born 1964, chief conductor of De Nederlandse Opera in Amsterdam from 2011
 Milan Albrecht, Slovak footballer
 Rafael Albrecht, Argentine footballer
 Raymond John Albrecht (1916–2006), American farmer and politician
 Susanne Albrecht, (born 1951), German activist (Red Army Faction)
 Sylvia Albrecht, German speed-skater
 Theo Albrecht, (1922–2010), German entrepreneur, founder of Aldi Nord
 Theo Albrecht Jr. (born 1950), German businessman
 Wilhelm Eduard Albrecht, (1800–1876), German jurist and politician
 William Albrecht, American agronomist

Other
 Albrecht v. Herald Co., a 1968 U.S. Supreme Court decision

See also
 Alberich

References

German masculine given names
German-language surnames
Patronymic surnames
Surnames from given names